Class 59 may refer to:
 British Rail Class 59
 DRG Class 59, German steam locomotive
 Württemberg K, later became the DRG Class 59